William Price (June 10, 1863 – August 7, 1922) was a pitcher in Major League Baseball. He played for the Philadelphia Athletics of the American Association in one game on April 27, 1890.

Sources

Baseball players from Pennsylvania
Major League Baseball pitchers
19th-century baseball players
Philadelphia Athletics (AA) players
Lebanon (minor league baseball) players
1863 births
1922 deaths